The John Armstrong House is a private residential structure located at 707 Monroe Street in the city of Lapeer in Lapeer County, Michigan.  It was designated as a Michigan State Historic Site and also added to the National Register of Historic Places on July 26, 1985.

Description
Built in 1887–1888, the 2½-story house was built in the architectural mix of Queen Anne and Late Victorian style.  The house features an irregular floor plan with a variety of window shapes.  It was constructed with a combination of stone, brick, and wood for the various features.  The interior design of the structure has remained unchanged since its original construction, including a second floor cistern.  Between 1888 and 1892, a two-story addition was built on the back.  In 1917, the dormer on the third floor was removed after a fire.  In 1941, the porches were altered, and one was removed.

History
The house was built for prominent local businessman Joseph Armstrong, who moved to the United States from Ireland in 1871.  In 1872, he moved to Lapeer in part due to the expanding railroad in the area.  He opened a dry goods store that he operated for the next 37 years before retiring.  He purchased the site of his home in 1886 and contracted a local carpenter, Robert T. Bacon, to construct the house and other smaller structures on the property within the next two years.

Following Joseph Armstrong's death, the property passed to his son, Jay Armstrong. Jay died in 1956. His wife, Evelyn, lived alone in the house until her death in 1981 when the house was sold.

References

Houses on the National Register of Historic Places in Michigan
Michigan State Historic Sites
Houses in Lapeer County, Michigan
Houses completed in 1888
Victorian architecture in Michigan
Queen Anne architecture in Michigan
National Register of Historic Places in Lapeer County, Michigan